Carina Karlsson (born 11 September 1963) is a former professional tennis player from Sweden.

Biography
Karlsson is most noted for being the first qualifier to reach the ladies quarterfinals of Wimbledon, which she achieved at the 1984 Wimbledon Championships. She began the main draw with wins over Anne White and Christiane Jolissaint, then defeated former Wimbledon champion Virginia Wade in the third round, 11–9 in the deciding set. In the fourth round she upset 15th seed Andrea Temesvári to set up a quarterfinal against Chris Evert-Lloyd, which Evert won in straight sets.

Her Wimbledon run took her ranking to 59 in the world, and she peaked at 42 the following year. She was a losing finalist to Katerina Maleeva at the 1985 Hewlett-Packard Trophy in Hilversum. Her performances began to experience a slump, attributed in part to eye problems, and in 1987, she started competing wearing eyeglasses. She made the round of 16 at the 1987 French Open, but retired from professional tennis at the end of the year.

She featured in a total of seven Fed Cup ties for Sweden.

WTA Tour finals

Singles (0-1)

Doubles (0-1)

References

External links
 
 
 

1963 births
Living people
Swedish female tennis players
20th-century Swedish women
21st-century Swedish women